

League notes
The League said it would announce midseason Allstar Teams, starting this year.

Regular season

Midseason All-Star Teams

Playoffs
Semi-Finals
Brandon defeated Braves 3-games-to-none
Rangers defeated St. Boniface 3-games-to-none
Turnbull Cup Championship
Brandon lost to Rangers 4-games-to-2
Western Memorial Cup Semi-Final
Rangers  defeated Fort William Canadiens (TBJHL) 4-games-to-3
Western Memorial Cup Final (Abbott Cup)
Rangers lost to Edmonton Oil Kings (CAHL) 4-games-to-1

Awards

All-Star Teams

References
Manitoba Junior Hockey League
Manitoba Hockey Hall of Fame
Hockey Hall of Fame
Winnipeg Free Press Archives
Brandon Sun Archives

MJHL
Manitoba Junior Hockey League seasons